Ranaka is a village located in the Southern District of Botswana.

It had 3,089 inhabitants in 2012.

Settlements
Ranaka is divided into 14 settlements:

 Dinogeng, 114 inhabitants
 Gakgobolo, 28 inhabitants
 Kgamagadi, 4 inhabitants
 Kgokgole, 25 inhabitants
 Lohatlheng, 5 inhabitants
 Lohawe, 8 inhabitants
 Lonatong, 30 inhabitants
 Mmabokgale, 3 inhabitants
 Mmadigetwane
 Mmadinonyane, 12 inhabitants
 Momare, 28 inhabitants
 Rakgokgonyane, 20 inhabitants
 Tsitlane, 12 inhabitants
 Tsonye, 70 inhabitants

See also
 List of cities in Botswana

References

Populated places in Botswana